Physetica is a genus of moths of the family Noctuidae. This genus is endemic to New Zealand.

Taxonomy
This genus was first described by Edward Meyrick in 1887. In 2017 Robert Hoare undertook a revision of New Zealand Noctuinae and expanded the species included in this genus.

Distribution
Species in this genus are only found in New Zealand.

Conservation status
None of the species contained within this genus are regarded as being threatened.

Species
The following species are found within the genus:
 Physetica caerulea (Guenée, 1868) 
 Physetica cucullina (Guenée, 1868) 
 Physetica funerea (Philpott, 1927) 
 Physetica homoscia (Meyrick, 1887) 
 Physetica longstaffi (Howes, 1911) 
 Physetica phricias (Meyrick, 1888) 
 Physetica prionistis (Meyrick, 1887) 
 Physetica sequens (Howes, 1912) 
 Physetica temperata (Walker, 1858)

References

External links
 
 iNaturalist (World Checklist)

Hadeninae
Endemic fauna of New Zealand
Noctuoidea genera
Endemic moths of New Zealand